Geilo Station is a railway station located at Geilo, Norway. The station is served by up to seven daily express trains operated by Vy Tog.

History

The station was opened as part of the Bergen Line between Bergen and Gulsvik in 1907.

References

External links
 Jernbaneverket's page on Geilo

Railway stations in Buskerud
Railway stations on Bergensbanen
Railway stations opened in 1907